Servicios Aéreos Profesionales, S.A. (also known as SAP Air or SAP Group) is an airline with its corporate headquarters on the property of La Isabela International Airport in Santo Domingo, Dominican Republic. It operates services in the Caribbean area.

History

The airline was established in 1981 and is wholly owned by Miguel Patin Hernandez.

Services

Servicios Aéreos Profesionales operates the following services (as of June 2008):

Domestic charter flights: La Romana, Puerto Plata, Punta Cana, Samana, Santiago and Bridgetown.
International charter destinations: Fort Lauderdale, Cancún, Montego Bay, Pointe-à-Pitre, Porlamar, St Lucia, San Juan, Bridgetown and Varadero.
Business Aviation: (Aircraft types: Learjet 55, Learjet 35, Learjet 25 and Hawker 125-600)
Crew Transfer Flights
Connections Flights: Connections throughout the Dominican Republic and The Caribbean.
Air Ambulance: Professional Air Ambulance Services as well as medical assistance on board. Available 24 Hours, 7 Days a week.
Air Excursions: Excursions for Individuals and Groups.

SAP Group provides light snacks and refreshments on all flights.

Fleet

Current fleet

The SAP fleet includes the following aircraft (at April 2021):

Former fleet
SAP formerly operated the following aircraft:

6 Beechcraft 1900
1 Embraer EMB 120 Brasilia
4 Let L-410 Turbolet
1 Saab 340B Operated for Air Santo Domingo

See also
List of airlines of the Dominican Republic

References

External links

Servicios Aéreos Profesionales 

Airlines established in 1981
Airlines of the Dominican Republic
Brands of the Dominican Republic